The Great Wall Wingle is series of pick-up trucks manufactured by the Chinese company Great Wall Motors  (风骏) since 2010, based on the original Great Wall Wingle — since renamed the Great Wall Wingle 3. The second version is the Great Wall Wingle 5 while a third is the Great Wall Wingle 6 and the fourth is  the Great Wall Wingle 7.

Wingle 3 (2006–2010)
The Great Wall Wingle 3, previously the Great Wall Wingle, is a compact pick-up truck built and marketed by the Chinese automaker Great Wall Motors since December 2006. In 2009, it became the first Chinese-made ute or pick-up to be sold in Australia, where it is marketed as the V-Series. It was also made available in Italy, with the model name Steed.

The body shell was licensed from Isuzu based on an earlier Isuzu/GM model which was sold as an Isuzu Rodeo. The steering wheels used in the truck are Toyota designs found in models like the Camry and Sienna.

Australian market
The diesel engines are of Great Wall design and manufacture. The V240 was specified as standard with alloy wheels, AM/FM CD radio, electric windows, leather trimmed seats, disc/drum brakes and air-conditioning.

Wingle 5 (2010–present) 
A new pick-up named the Wingle 5 was released in March 2010 and the original was renamed Wingle 3. It was marketed as the Great Wall Steed in the United Kingdom, with sales beginning in 2012. It was the first Chinese vehicle to be sold in the country. In 2017, the Great Wall Steed was no longer sold in the United Kingdom.

Australian market
In Australia, the Wingle 5 remained marketed as the V240. In 2010, a single-cab model was released which, in the Australian market, replaced the SA220 (Great Wall Sailor). In 2011, the dual-cab V240 was upgraded to the newly released Wingle 5.

Ukraine market

Safety
The African version of the Steed 5 with no airbags and no ABS received 0 stars for adult occupants and 1 star for toddlers from Global NCAP in 2020 (similar to Latin NCAP 2013).

The Chinese-made Wingle 5 in its most basic version for Latin America with 2 airbags, no pretensioners, and no ESC obtained 0 stars from Latin NCAP in 2021 under its new protocol (similar to Euro NCAP 2014).

Wingle 6 (2014–2021)
In April 2014, the new Wingle 6 was introduced, featuring amongst other things LED headlights, a rear differential lock, reversing camera and parking sensors, and a tire pressure monitoring system. It is powered by the same 2.0-litre diesel and 2.4-litre petrol engines as the Wingle 5.

The updated Wingle 6 was released in Australia in 2017, with only the 2.0 L diesel engine available.

As of 2021, production has ended on the Wingle 6.

Wingle 7 (2018-2022)
The Wingle (风骏) 7 is a pick-up truck manufactured by the Chinese company Great Wall Motors since 2018.



References

External links

Official website
Golden Arrow S.A. Paraguayan official representative

Wingle
Pickup trucks
Global NCAP pick-ups
Latin NCAP pick-ups
Trucks of China
2000s cars
2010s cars
Cars of China